Louis Mendes (born June 15, 1940) is a photographer from New York City who is known for his signature press camera, portraits and street portraits.

Life and work
Mendes was born in a working-class family in Jamaica, Queens, New York, in 1940. He was a young child when his elder sister handed him a camera to begin documenting family events. Later Mendes would study at the RCA Institute of Technology.  After stints of working in retail including Macy's on 34th street, Mendes turned to photography.

Mendes predominantly uses a Graflex Speed Graphic camera; he has also used a Polaroid Spectra, modified Polaroid 110b, view camera and medium and large format cameras.

Publications

Publications by Mendes
 The Magic Within. Self published by Raymond Ortiz / chiefbooks using Blurb, 2010. 
 Mestrado Fotografo. Self published by Raymond Ortiz / chiefbooks using Blurb, 2010. 
 One Of A Kind. Self published by Raymond Ortiz / chiefbooks using Blurb, 2010. 
 Monumental. Self published by Raymond Ortiz / chiefbooks using Blurb, 2010.

Publications with mentions of Mendes
One Hundred Jobs: A Panorama of Work in the American City. The New Press, 2000. By Ron Howell and with photographs by Ozier Muhammad.
Coney Island. W. W. Norton & Company, 1998. By Harvey Stein.

References

American photographers
Street photographers
Living people
1940 births